The weightlifting competition at the 1928 Summer Olympics in Amsterdam consisted of five weight classes, all for men only. The competitions were held on Saturday, 28 July 1928, and on Sunday, 29 July 1928.

Medal summary

Participating nations
Every nation was allowed to participate with a maximum of two weightlifters in every event. Five nations entered the maximum of ten competitors.

A total of 92 weightlifters from 19 nations competed at the Amsterdam Games:

Medal table

References

Sources
 

 
1928 Summer Olympics events
1928